Jeron Roberts (born November 10, 1976) is a retired American-Israeli professional basketball player. He played college basketball at the University of Wyoming. He was called up by Israel national basketball team manager Zvi ("Zvika") Sherf to represent Israel at the European Championships 2007 in Spain.

Biography

He obtained Israeli citizenship in 2006. He was a starter for the Israel national basketball team during the 2007 European Championships.

After coaching at Pacific University, he is currently athletic director at Bristol University in Anaheim, California

References

1976 births
Living people
Amsterdam Basketball players
AEL Limassol B.C. players
American men's basketball players
APOEL B.C. players
Dutch Basketball League players
Hapoel Tel Aviv B.C. players
Ironi Ashkelon players
Ironi Nahariya players
Israeli American
Israeli men's basketball players
Israeli Basketball Premier League players
Karşıyaka basketball players
Maccabi Ashdod B.C. players
Maccabi Kiryat Motzkin basketball players
Shooting guards
Sportspeople from California
Wyoming Cowboys basketball players